Carl Wuttke (3 January 1849, Trebnitz - 4 July 1927, Munich) was a German landscape and architectural painter.

Biography 
From 1871 to 1873, he studied at the Berlin University of the Arts, then with Angelo Quaglio in Munich. In 1874, he travelled to Italy on foot and remained there until 1876. After returning to Germany, he studied with Eugen Dücker at the Kunstakademie Düsseldorf until 1880.

Later, he went back to Italy, visiting Sardinia and Sicily as well. Many of his best-known works were sketched in those locations. He also made brief trips to Andalusia (1880) and Norway (1894). After 1885, he was a resident of Munich.

Some of his trips were to places considered exotic at the time; including Algeria, Egypt and the Sudan. In 1893, he visited the United States and, from 1897 to 1899, made a trip around the world, which included stops in China and Japan (1898). His sketches from there were used to create paintings for Kaiser Wilhelm II, which were hung in the "Silbersaal" (Silver Hall) of the Berliner Stadtschloss.

His landscapes often include small genre scenes. As he progressed, his colors tended to grow brighter and his composition took on a fleeting effect, so that his work is often categorized as "Pre-Impressionist", but he never associated himself with any Secessionist movement.

Writings 
 Reise-Erinnerungen von Studienfahrten rings um die Erde (Travel memories of study trips around the world), Franz'sche Buchdruckerei, Munich, 1914

References

External links 

 More works by Wuttke @ ArtNet

1849 births
1927 deaths
German painters
German landscape painters
Kunstakademie Düsseldorf alumni
People from Trzebnica